Aulites is a genus of brachiopods belonging to the family Cryptoporidae.

The species of this genus are found in Australia.

Species:

Aulites brazieri 
Aulites crosnieri

References

Brachiopod genera